The 1957 Ladies Open Championships was held at the Lansdowne Club in London from 18 to 23 February. Janet Morgan won her eighth consecutive title defeating Sheila Speight in a repeat of the 1956 final.

Seeds

Draw and results

First round

denotes seed *

Second round

Third round

Quarter-finals

Semi-finals

Final

References

Women's British Open Squash Championships
Women's British Open Squash Championships
Women's British Open Squash Championships
Squash competitions in London
Women's British Open Championships
British Open Championships 
Women's British Open Squash Championships